Akhisar railway station is a station in Akhisar, Turkey. TCDD Taşımacılık operates four trains, both from Izmir, that stop at the station: the Izmir Blue Train to Eskişehir, the Karesi Express to Balıkesir as well as the 6th of September Express and the 17th of September Express to Bandırma. As of 26 March 2020, all passenger train service has been temporarily suspended, due to the COVID-19 pandemic.

The station was opened on 20 April 2018, as a replacement to the original station, located in the city center.

References

External links
Station information
Station timetable

Railway stations in Manisa Province
Railway stations opened in 1890
1890 establishments in the Ottoman Empire
Akhisar District